Brosset's big-eared bat (Micronycteris brosseti) is a bat species found in Brazil, French Guiana, Guyana and Peru. It feeds on insects and sometimes fruit and the exact population is unknown. The only listed threat is deforestation.

References

Micronycteris
Bats of South America
Bats of Brazil
Mammals described in 1998